I Marinella tragouda Giorgo Zampeta & Aki Panou (Greek: Η Μαρινέλλα τραγουδά Γιώργο Ζαμπέτα & Άκη Πάνου; Marinella in songs of Giorgos Zampetas and Akis Panou) is a compilation by popular Greek singer Marinella. It was released in 1996 in Greece by PolyGram Greece – Mercury and includes 17 recordings of songs composed by Giorgos Zampetas and Akis Panou that Marinella recorded from 1967 to 1972 for PolyGram Records.

Track listing 
 "Stalia – stalia" (Σταλιά – σταλιά) – (Giorgos Zampetas – Dionisis Tzefronis) – 3:23
 This song had been released on Stalia – Stalia and as a single on 11 March 1968.
 "Pios ein' aftos"  (Ποιος είν' αυτός) – (Giorgos Zampetas – Pythagoras) – 3:10
 This song had been released on Stalia – Stalia and as a single on 30 November 1968.
 "Ti na ftei" (Τι να φταίει) – (Giorgos Zampetas – Dimitris Christodoulou) – 3:05
 This song had been released on Otan Simani Esperinos and as a single on 10 June 1969.
 "Kane kardia mou ipomoni" (Κάνε καρδιά μου υπομονή) – (Giorgos Zampetas – Charalampos Vasiliadis) – 2:38
 This song had been released on Ena Tragoudi Ein' I Zoi Mou on 27 March 1970.
 "De symfonisame"  (Δε συμφωνήσαμε) – (Giorgos Zampetas – Giannis Kalamitsis) – 2:40
 This song had been released as a single on 14 September 1972.
 "Den ginete allios"  (Δεν γίνεται αλλιώς) – (Giorgos Zampetas – Giannis Kalamitsis) – 3:17
 This song had been released as a single on 14 September 1972.
 "I astati"  (Η άστατη) – (Giorgos Zampetas – Pythagoras) – 3:05
 This song had been released as a single on 20 October 1970.
 "Vale pioto" (Βάλε πιοτό) – (Giorgos Zampetas – Pythagoras) – 2:42
 This song had been released on Marinella – Enas Mythos and as a single on 20 October 1970.
 "Se kartero" (Σε καρτερώ) – (Giorgos Zampetas – Charalampos Vasiliadis) – 3:13
 This song had been released on Ena Tragoudi Ein' I Zoi Mou on 27 March 1970.
 "Enas taxidiotis" (Ένας ταξιδιώτης) – (Giorgos Zampetas – Dionisis Tzefronis) – 3:09
 This song had been released on Stalia – Stalia and as a single on 19 March 1968.
 "Pira tou dromous" (Πήρα τους δρόμους) – (Giorgos Zampetas – Dimitris Christodoulou) – 2:42
 This song had been released on Stalia – Stalia and as a single on 11 March 1968.
 "Mia agapi chanete" (Μια αγάπη χάνεται) – (Giorgos Zampetas – Pythagoras) – 3:00
 This song had been released as a single on 19 March 1968.
 "Vathia sti thalassa tha peso" (Βαθιά στη θάλασσα θα πέσω) – (Giorgos Zambetas – Charalampos Vasiliadis) – 3:17
 This song had been released on Athanata Rebetika on 24 November 1972.
 "Ta pikramena dilina" (Τα πικραμένα δειλινά) – (Giorgos Zampetas – Napoleon Eleftheriou) – 2:48
 This song had been released on Otan Simani Esperinos and as a single on 10 June 1969.
 "Glikocharazi, xipnise" – (Γλυκοχαράζει, ξύπνησε) – (Giorgos Zampetas – Charalampos Vasiliadis) – 2:59
 This song had been released on Stalia – Stalia and as a single on 30 November 1968.
 "Kita me sta matia" (Κοίτα με στα μάτια) – (Akis Panou) – 3:16
 This song had been released as a single on 13 April 1971.
 "Piretos (Kathe gnorimia)" (Πυρετός) – (Akis Panou) – 2:42
 This song had been released as a single on 13 April 1971.

Personnel 
 Marinella – vocals, background vocals
 Giorgos Zampetas – arranger, conductor on tracks 1 – 15
 Akis Panou – arranger, conductor on tracks 16 and 17
 Mimis Plessas – arranger, conductor on "Vathia sti thalassa tha peso"
 Yiannis Smyrneos – recording engineer
 PolyGram Records – producer
 Alinta Mavrogeni – photographer
 Petros Paraschis – artwork

References

1996 albums
1996 compilation albums
Greek-language albums
Marinella compilation albums
Universal Music Greece albums